Berberis and Mahonia are two widespread and common members of the Berberidaceae, found in many countries. Botanists have for many years had no consensus on the classification, some preferring to treat the group as a single genus (Berberis), while others opt to separate the two groups into distinct genera. Therefore, many species have two scientific name, one in Berberis, the other in Mahonia, each used by botanists on one side the debate.

A third generic name, Odostemon, can be found in older literature. It is considered by most authorities to be a rejected synonym for Mahonia, yet the Plant List does accept a few species in this genus.

This is an old argument not likely to be resolved soon, and certainly not here on Wikipedia. Our interest is in assisting readers find the web pages on the appropriate species, despite the dual nomenclature. Below are species accepted by The Plant List as members of one genus or the other, all alphabetized by specific epithet with links to synonyms in the other genus, if such a synonym exists.

A

B

C

D

E

F

G

H

I

J

K

L

M

N

O

P

Q

R

S

T

U

V

W

X

Y

Z

References

Berberis Mahonia